Breaking Dawn is a 2004 American independent horror-thriller film written and directed by Mark Edwin Robinson. It is the directorial debut of Robinson, who was 22 at the time and saw the film showcased at the Cannes Film Festival, Marché du Film and at The Hollywood Film Festival.  The film stars Kelly Overton and James Haven.

Plot
Dawn, a young medical student is charged with uncovering the murder of a mental patient's mother. The patient, Don, holds many secrets and disturbs Dawn with his insane ramblings. As Dawn continues to investigate the murder, she believes Don's paranoia is out of control at the mention of a menacing figure named Malachi. She begins to question whether Malachi exists when she is stalked by a mysterious figure or if her imagination and Don's craziness are affecting her judgement.

Cast
Kelly Overton as Dawn
James Haven as Don Wake
Sarah-Jane Potts as Anna
Hank Harris as Ted
Edie McClurg as Nurse Olivia
Kathryn Joosten as Neighbor
Isaac C. Singleton Jr. as Attendant Rufus
Diane Venora as Mother
Joe Morton as Prof. Simon
Dave Ruby as Opie
Jennette McCurdy as Little Girl

Production
The film was shot over 18 days on 35 mm film in California.

Music
The only song heard during the film is Here to Stay by Colombian-American composer and interpreter Arthur Yoria at the closing credits.

References

External links
 

2004 films
American supernatural horror films
American independent films
American mystery films
American horror thriller films
Films directed by Mark Edwin Robinson
Films shot in California
Films set in psychiatric hospitals
2004 directorial debut films
2000s English-language films
2000s American films